Dino Bertolo (born 3 March 1953) is a French racing cyclist. He rode in the 1978 Tour de France.

References

External links
 

1953 births
Living people
French male cyclists
Place of birth missing (living people)